Anatoliy Pavlovych Bondarchuk (born 31 May 1940) is a retired Ukrainian hammer thrower who competed for the Soviet Union. An Olympic gold medallist, he is also regarded as one of the most accomplished hammer throw coaches of all time. He is the author of a two-volume book Transfer of Training, which was translated from Russian to English by Michael Yessis.

As an athlete, Bondarchuk accumulated numerous international awards and honors throughout a long career.  Beginning the hammer throw at a late age of 24, he won his first international title at the 1969 European Championships. Near the end of the season, Bondarchuk set two world records in the event. Bondarchuk remained among the world's elite for several years and won the gold medal at the 1972 Summer Olympics while setting an Olympic Record of 75.50 meters.  Four years later, he earned the bronze medal at the 1976 Summer Olympics. For his Olympic achievements Bondarchuk was awarded the Order of the Badge of Honour in 1972 and the Order of the Red Banner of Labour in 1976.

Despite his athletic success, Bondarchuk is equally well known as a coach. He began coaching while competing himself and has since worked with medal-winning athletes at five Olympic Games. His most famous trainee is two-time Olympic champion and current hammer world record holder Yuri Sedykh. Bondarchuck is currently living and coaching in Kamloops, British Columbia, Canada, where he guided Canadian shot put record holder Dylan Armstrong to a bronze medal at the 2008 Summer Olympics. His trainees in hammer throw include Canadian record holder Sultana Frizell, former Canadian record holders Jennifer Joyce and Crystal Smith, Megann Rodhe, U.S. champion Kibwe Johnson, Caymanian record holder Michael Letterlough, Swiss champion Martin Bingisser and 2012 Canadian Olympian Justin Rodhe.

References

1940 births
Living people
People from Starokostiantyniv
Ukrainian male hammer throwers
Soviet male hammer throwers
Olympic athletes of the Soviet Union
Honoured Masters of Sport of the USSR
Athletes (track and field) at the 1972 Summer Olympics
Athletes (track and field) at the 1976 Summer Olympics
Olympic gold medalists for the Soviet Union
Olympic bronze medalists for the Soviet Union
Russian athletics coaches
World record setters in athletics (track and field)
European Athletics Championships medalists
Medalists at the 1976 Summer Olympics
Medalists at the 1972 Summer Olympics
Olympic gold medalists in athletics (track and field)
Olympic bronze medalists in athletics (track and field)
Sportspeople from Khmelnytskyi Oblast